Berend McKenzie is a Canadian actor and playwright. As an actor he is most known for playing Lance in the 2004 film, Catwoman. As a playwright Berend is most known for his controversial play, Nggrfg (Nigger fag, subtitled, Would You Say the Name of This Play?).

Biography 
Berend is of African descent. He was adopted by a Caucasian family; growing up in Alberta. There he found little support for being homosexual due his family's Christian beliefs. He also found it hard to be a gay black male in Alberta, often being called the slurs, "nigger" and "fag"; this subsequently inspired his play, Nggrfg, an exploration of the two words that he was called the most growing up. After being caught in a "drunken grope-fest" with another boy at a party, his student council asked him to leave school as they feared he "wouldn't be safe." McKenzie fled both home and school shortly after.

Career and success of "Nggrfg" 
Berend made his film debut in the 2002 movie, Life or Something Like It in a small role alongside Angelina Jolie. As a film actor, Berend is most known for playing the role of sassy art department representative, Lance in the 2004 action superhero film, Catwoman alongside Alex Borstein and Halle Berry. In 2006 McKenzie debuted at the Edmonton Fringe Festival with his first full-length play, Get Off the Cross, Mary, a queer disco puppet remake of The Passion of the Christ. This play won the Xtra West Hero Award for Best Live Performance in 2008. McKenzie's second full-length play debuted in 2010, Nggrfg, an autobiographical play regarding the two most used slurs he heard growing up in Alberta, Canada. Nggrfg is set up as four stories told by McKenzie about growing up black and gay in Alberta, with little tolerance for each by his peers. The play earned a Jessie Award nomination for Original Script and was also run at Halifax's Queer Acts Theatre Festival. An adaptation of the play entitled, Tassels, was also made in order to portray an appropriate storyline for elementary and middle schools.

Film

Television

Playwright

References

External links 
 Berend McKenzie on IMDb

Living people
21st-century Canadian male actors
21st-century Canadian dramatists and playwrights
Canadian autobiographers
Canadian male film actors
Canadian male stage actors
Canadian male television actors
Canadian male voice actors
Canadian gay writers
Canadian male dramatists and playwrights
Canadian LGBT dramatists and playwrights
Black Canadian writers
Black Canadian male actors
Writers from Alberta
Male actors from Alberta
Black Canadian LGBT people
Canadian male non-fiction writers
Year of birth missing (living people)
21st-century Canadian LGBT people
Canadian gay actors
Gay dramatists and playwrights